Kwanga (Gawanga) is a Sepik language spoken in Gawanga Rural LLG of East Sepik Province, Papua New Guinea.

Classification
There are two main dialects, and five subdialects. The 14th (2000) edition of Ethnologue classified Apos, Bongos, Wasambu, and Yubanakor as distinct languages, and assigned them the ISO codes apo, bxy, wsm, and yuo, respectively. They have since been subsumed under Kwanga.

Dialects are:
Apos
Bongos (Bongomaise, Bongomamsi, Kambaminchi, Nambi)
Tau (Kubiwat, Mangamba, Nambes)
Wasambu
Yubanakor (Daina)

References

Nukuma languages
Languages of East Sepik Province
Languages of Sandaun Province